Michael Racy is an American sports executive, higher education officer and attorney. Racy currently serves as the commissioner for the Mid-America Intercollegiate Athletics Association (MIAA). Prior to being selected as the new MIAA commissioner, Racy practiced law in the Kansas City metropolitan area, served as a vice president at the University of Central Missouri, and vice president at the National Collegiate Athletic Association.

Early years
Racy was born in Lawrence, Kansas and attended Abilene High School in central Kansas. After high school, Racy attended Washburn University where he earned is Bachelor of Business Administration, graduating with honors in 1987. Racy then went on to complete his Juris Doctor from the University of Missouri–Kansas City School of Law, graduating with honors in 1992. Racy began his career in sports working at the National Association of Intercollegiate Athletics while he was earning his J.D. degree.

Career
After graduating from UMKC in 1992, Racy practiced law at Gage and Tucker Law Firm in Kansas City, Missouri. In 1993, Racy moved to the NCAA to become a legislative assistant. In 1999, Racy became a vice president and served as the chief executive officer for the Division II level. While leading NCAA Division II, Racy developed the NCAA Sports Festival, as well as secured a television agreement with CBS College Sports for regular season D2 football and basketball games, managed the $30 million budget for the division, designed the NCAA Division II "Life in the Balance" Strategic Positioning Platform, and established the Make-A-Wish Foundation fundraising partnership for Division II student-athletes.

In June 2013, after fifteen years as a vice president for the NCAA, Racy voluntarily stepped away from this visible leadership position to discover new paths and new opportunities in higher education.  That summer, Racy become the VP for Law, Policy and Strategy at the University of Central Missouri in Warrensburg, Missouri. In 2015, Racy left Central Missouri to become a higher education consultant. On September 7, 2016, it was announced that Racy would become the fifth full-time commissioner for the Mid-America Intercollegiate Athletics Association.

Since Racy became the commissioner of the MIAA, the Association has won 18 NCAA National Championships, in 11 different sports, by 8 different MIAA member schools.  During his short tenure, Racy has created the MIAA Media Network, moved the conference office to a visible space in Hy-Vee Arena (formerly Kemper Arena in Kansas City), doubled the number of MIAA corporate partners, and started a conference-wide risk management initiative.

References

External links
 MIAA profile

Year of birth missing (living people)
Living people
Mid-America Intercollegiate Athletics Association commissioners
National Collegiate Athletic Association people
University of Missouri–Kansas City alumni
Washburn University alumni
People from Lawrence, Kansas
Sportspeople from Kansas